Don Ross (born 20 February 1934) is a former Australian rules footballer who represented  in the Victorian Football League (VFL).

Ross played as a centreman but was also used as a ruck-rover or at half forward for Footscray. He played in Footscray's 1954 VFL Grand Final premiership win against Melbourne.

He won the club best and fairest award in 1956.

External links

1934 births
Living people
Australian rules footballers from New South Wales
Western Bulldogs players
Western Bulldogs Premiership players
Charles Sutton Medal winners
North Albury Football Club players
One-time VFL/AFL Premiership players